South Windham may refer to:

South Windham, Connecticut, a census-designated place in the town of Windham, Connecticut
South Windham, Maine, a census-designated place in the town of Windham, Maine